The Bulgarian Journal of Agricultural Science is an open access peer-reviewed scientific journal published bimonthly by the Agricultural Academy in Bulgaria since 1995. The journal is edited by Maya Ignatova.

Abstracting and indexing
The journal is indexed and abstracted in the following bibliographic databases:

References

External links

English-language journals
Publications established in 1995
Agricultural journals
Academic journals of Bulgaria
Bimonthly journals
Open access journals